The Brook is one of the suburbs of Nelson, New Zealand. It lies to the south of Nelson and is the location of the Brook Waimarama Sanctuary, a conservation project at the head of the Brook Valley.

Geography

The Brook covers a land area of 6.90 km².

It has seven public reserves: Andrews Farm Reserve, Betsy Eyre Park, Brook Park, Grampians Reserve, Grove Reserve, Tantragee Reserve and Wards Reserve.

The Seymour Avenue Heritage Precinct consists of a tree lined street at the North West corner of the suburb. The avenue consist of a short street with a mix of transitional villa and Californian bungalow style houses. The initial subdivision occurred in the 1910s with additional development on the 1940s. The subdivision was created on land originally part of a 20 acre property owned by Alfred Fell who built the first house on the land in 1854. This house was purchased by Nathaniel Edwards in 1860 and was considerably extended  in the Victorian Gothic Revivalist style. Warwick House as this house is now named still looms over Seymour Avenue and is used as a function and wedding venue.

History

The estimated population of The Brook reached 1,700 in 1996.

It reached 1,720 in 2001, 1,605 in 2006, 1,857 in 2013, and 1,992 in 2018.

Demography

The Brook had a population of 1,992 at the 2018 New Zealand census, an increase of 135 people (7.3%) since the 2013 census, and an increase of 387 people (24.1%) since the 2006 census. There were 735 households. There were 969 males and 1,023 females, giving a sex ratio of 0.95 males per female. The median age was 37.8 years (compared with 37.4 years nationally), with 468 people (23.5%) aged under 15 years, 312 (15.7%) aged 15 to 29, 996 (50.0%) aged 30 to 64, and 216 (10.8%) aged 65 or older.

Ethnicities were 92.2% European/Pākehā, 8.4% Māori, 1.7% Pacific peoples, 5.7% Asian, and 1.5% other ethnicities (totals add to more than 100% since people could identify with multiple ethnicities).

The proportion of people born overseas was 26.2%, compared with 27.1% nationally.

Although some people objected to giving their religion, 65.2% had no religion, 23.0% were Christian, 0.2% were Hindu, 0.2% were Muslim, 1.1% were Buddhist and 3.0% had other religions.

Of those at least 15 years old, 435 (28.5%) people had a bachelor or higher degree, and 222 (14.6%) people had no formal qualifications. The median income was $31,100, compared with $31,800 nationally. The employment status of those at least 15 was that 777 (51.0%) people were employed full-time, 288 (18.9%) were part-time, and 42 (2.8%) were unemployed.

Economy

In 2018, 7.0% worked in manufacturing, 9.3% worked in construction, 7.0% worked in hospitality, 4.2% worked in transport, 9.6% worked in education, and 14.0% worked in healthcare.

Transport
As of 2018, among those who commute to work, 66.6% drove a car, 3.1% rode in a car, 0.0% use public transport, 10.1% use a bike, and 10.1% walk or run.

References

Suburbs of Nelson, New Zealand
Populated places in the Nelson Region